Villiers-sur-Tholon is a former commune in the Yonne department in Bourgogne-Franche-Comté in north-central France. On 1 January 2017, it was merged into the new commune Montholon. The bibliographer Ferdinand Pouy (1824–1891) was born in this village.

Population

See also
Communes of the Yonne department

References

Former communes of Yonne